Friedrich "Fritz" Kehl (born 12 July 1937) is a Swiss football defender who played for Switzerland in the 1962 FIFA World Cup. He also played for FC Zürich.

References

1937 births
Swiss men's footballers
Switzerland international footballers
Association football defenders
FC Zürich players
1962 FIFA World Cup players
Living people